Yordan Todorov – Paro (born 12 November 1981) is a Bulgarian  footballer, who plays as a midfielder for Kom.

Career
Todorov spent almost his entire career at Montana.  Between 2016–2018 he played for Kariana but was released at the end of the 2017–18 season.  In July 2018, Todorov joined Kom.

References

1981 births
Living people
People from Montana, Bulgaria
Bulgarian footballers
First Professional Football League (Bulgaria) players
Second Professional Football League (Bulgaria) players
FC Montana players
FC Kariana Erden players
Association football midfielders